Nurlan is a Turkic masculine given name that is mostly common in Azerbaijan, Kazakhstan and Uzbekistan. The name is essentially a combination of the Arabic word Noor (also spelled as "Nur") meaning light, ray or shine and the  Turkic word "Lan/Ulan" which means lion in most Turkic languages.  Thus, the name itself can be translated into "radiant lion".

Given name 

Nurlan Balgimbayev (1947–2015), former Prime Minister of Kazakhstan
Nurlan Dulatbekov (born 1962), the Chancellor of Karagandy “Bolashak” University
Nurlan Iskakov, the Minister of Environmental Protection in the Government of Kazakhstan
Nurlan Koizhaiganov (born 1977), retired amateur Kazakh Greco-Roman wrestler, who competed in the men's lightweight category
Nurlan Mendygaliyev (born 1961), Kazakhstani former water polo player who competed in the 1988 Summer Olympics
Nurlan Motuev, a Kyrgyz politician
Nurlan Nigmatulin (born 1962), Kazakh politician, Chairman of the Mazhilis of the Parliament of the Republic of Kazakhstan since 2016
Nurlan Orazbayev (born 1968), former Kazakh professional ice hockey player
Nurlan Yermekbayev (born 1963), Kazakh politician, diplomat, Minister of Defense

See also
Nur Land
Nuran (disambiguation)
Nurla

References 

Kazakh masculine given names